Makhdoom Shah Maroof Khushabi was a sufi, saint and preacher of Islamic of Qadiriyya Silsila. He was the successor of Shah Mubarak Haqani (From Uch Sharif). He was a member of the Chishti Order (due to his father Shiekh Adam) and the Qadiriyya order (due to his spiritual leader Shah Mubarak Haqani).

Early education and childhood 
Shah Maroof Khushabi was born in Pakpattan. His father name was Shiekh Adam. He got his early education from his father Sheikh Adam.

Parents and family background 
His family lineage goes to Fariduddin Ganjshakar, Ibrahim ibn Adham and Ameer ul Momineen Umar e Farooq.

Allegiance to Shah Mubarak And Silsila e Qadriyya 
In 908 Hijri, Shah Mubarak Haqani came to the forest near Khushab. People heard that a friend of Allah has come to the jungle but they did not dare to go there. Shah Maroof also listened and went to his place. Shah Mubarak  was in meditation when Shah Maroof arrived. Shah Mubarak warned him not to come but he approached nevertheless. He became unconscious when he came near to him. After 3 days he regained consciousness again. Shah Mubrakak was impressed by him. So he made him his successors linking him to Silsila e Qadiria.

Spiritual lineage 

He got his spiritual teachings from Shah Mubarak Haqani.

He belonged to Silsila e Qadriyya as below:

 Muhammad
 Ali
 Hasan al-Basri
 Habib al-Ajami
 Dawud Tai
 Maruf Karkhi
 Sirri Saqti
 Junayd of Baghdad
 Abu Bakr Shibli
 Abdul Aziz bin Hars bin Asad Yemeni Tamimi
 Abu Al Fazal Abdul Wahid Yemeni Tamimi
 Mohammad Yousuf Abu al-Farah Tartusi
 Abul Hasan Hankari
 Abu Saeed Mubarak Makhzoomi
 Abdul Qadir Gilani
 Syed Abdul Wahab Gilani
 Syed Abdul Salam Gilani
 Syed Ahmad Gilani
 Syed Masood Gilani
 Syed Ali Gilani
 Syed Shah Meer Gilani
 Shams Uddin Gilani
 Shah Muhamamd Ghoas Gilani
 Syed Mubarik Haqani
 Shah Maroof Khushabi

Successors 
His successor in Silsila e Qadiriyya and "Sajaada e Nasheen" was Sakhi Shah Suleman Noori Hazoori from Purana Bhalwal.

The following are his successors:

Shah Sulaimān Nūri Bhalwali
 Sheikh Abdullah Qureshi
 Syed Abdul Lateef
 Shah Muhammad Sherazi Shahpuri
 Sheikh Mehr Ali Ranjha

Teachings and blessings 
He travelled many places on the verdict of his "Murshid" and blessed everyone he met. He always remained in remembrance of Allah. At each place, the people gathered around him. He did not wanted to show himself but "it is impossible to hide a sun" so people always found him. It is said that many patients became fit on his one eyesight. Many non-Muslims became Muslim on his hand. He brought the message of Allah to Khushab

Death 
Shah Maroof Qadri Chisti Khushabi died on 10th Muharram 1579 in the era of Mughal king Jalal-uddin Mohammad Akbar.  His feast is held every year on 9th and 10th Muharram.

Shrine 

His shrine is situated in Khushab Sharif. It has a mosque with it.

References

Chishti Order
1579 deaths
Qadiri order
People from Khushab District